Damelin Correspondence College is a private correspondence college in South Africa, owned by Educor (The Education Investment Corporation Limited group). It was founded in 1955 by Johann Brumer, a teacher who started his career at Damelin and started developing long distance study materials.

The college offers diplomas and certificates under six schools: the Business School, Computer School, General School, Technical School and Vocational School.

References

External links

Educor's official site

Damelin
Higher education in South Africa
Colleges in South Africa
Educational institutions established in 1955
1955 establishments in South Africa